HarmonQuest is an American adult animated web series created by Dan Harmon and Spencer Crittenden. The show is part animated, part live action. Harmon and comedians Erin McGathy and Jeff Davis, along with game master Crittenden, play a fantasy roleplaying campaign in front of a live audience, while each episode features a special guest player.

It premiered on the subscription streaming service Seeso in July 2016. Due to uncertainty around Seeso's future, the show was transferred to VRV Select in June 2017, with its second season airing a few months later. In October 2018, VRV renewed HarmonQuest for a third season. The third season was released on August 18, 2019.

Cast and characters

Regulars
 Dan Harmon as Fondue Zoobag, a half-orc ranger.  He also plays Limerick O'Shift, Beor's resurrected brother, starting with season 3 episode 1
 Erin McGathy as Beor O'Shift, a half-elf barbarian warrior, she resembles the comic book character Red Sonja
 Jeff Davis as Boneweevil, a goblin rogue
 Spencer Crittenden as the Game Master, Charles the Dragon and various other characters

Guests

Season 1
 Paul F. Tompkins as Teflonto, Earthscar's village champion and captain of the town's militia. Also a friend, mentor, and role model to Fondue and Boneweevil. ("The Quest Begins")
 Chelsea Peretti as Deepak Chopra, a dwarven monk and the lone survivor of an attack by one of the arcane horrors unleashed by the Demon Seal. ("The Stonesaw Mines")
 Steve Agee as Tech Powers, a Hellspawn bard. ("Welcome to Freshport")
 Ron Funches as Captain Rib Sanchez, a famous sea captain and smuggler. ("Across the Durnam Sea")
 Aubrey Plaza as Hawaiian Coffee, a gnome alchemist and prisoner of the Manoa Prison Hole. ("Manoa Prison Hole")
 John Hodgman as Hohn Jodgman, a travelling merchant and sorcerer. ("Entering the Sandman Desert")
 Thomas Middleditch as Dildo Bogpelt, a hobbit-like native of the Doorest of Fores. ("The Doorest of Fores")
 Kumail Nanjiani as Eddie Lizzard, a Kobold janitor of the Dragon's Temple. ("The Dragon's Temple")
 River Butcher as James Dean, the enchanted spirit of a spectral paladin within a sword found by Fondue in the Stonesaw Mines. ("The Secret Hideout")
 Matt Gourley as Chadge, Fondue's absent father. ("Earthscar Village") 
 Nathan Fillion as Teddar Spice, the new Elf chief of Earthscar Village. ("Earthscar Village")

Season 2
 Gillian Jacobs as Chip, a goblin rogue that temporarily replaced Boneweevil during the year he was trapped in the Demon Realm. ("The Quest Continues")
 Rory Scovel as Krandrelarius, a human witch whose name is as unpredictable as his personality, a previous acquaintance of Boneweevil that lives in a swamp. ("Demon Realm Devilry")
 Aparna Nancherla as Beauflecks Devrye, a demon hunter of Bonebreak Village. ("Bonebreak Village")
 Paul Scheer as Sensodyne, the Tooth Beast. A creature covered in glistening enamel skin-like armor. ("Into the Abyss")
 Patton Oswalt as Sandpole, a magical sand nomad. ("Back to Sandman Desert")
 Janet Varney as Sedona, a dwarf sorceress and proprietor of the Barely Cursed Bazaar of Commerce. ("The Barely Cursed Bazaar of Commerce")
 Jason Mantzoukas as Gribble Grabble, (AKA Grabble Gribble,) a young, bright, but shifty orphan on the streets of Forlona. ("The City of Forlona")
 Elizabeth Olsen as Stirrup, a half-elf arsonist. ("The Keystone Obelisk")
 Rob Corddry as Sandy, a barbarian of the Skulltree Clan and old flame of Beor's. ("The Castle of Etylai")
 Kumail Nanjiani returns as Eddie Lizzard. ("The Sorcerer of the Storm")

Season 3

 Matt Gourley returns as Chadge.  Having found religion, wielding Fondue's old blade that has his spirit trapped inside of it. ("Goblopolis Lost")
 Kate Micucci as Hermie, a druid from a nearby transhelm. ("The Shattered Myriad")
 Tawny Newsome as Donna, a Skull Tree Clan barbarian from the same village as Beor and Lymerick. ("Ivory Quay")
 Reggie Watts as Graildokt, Quinzelflip and unnamed - three goblin allies from Goblopolis. ("Goblopolis Found")
 Joel Kim Booster as Toriamos the dwarven explorer and dungeon expert. ("Terra Scissus")
 Jared Logan as Dave Pendergast, a paladin officer. ("Shatternine Village")
 D'Arcy Carden as Hydronai Sesapoia, an adventurous bard. ("The Bloody Teeth")
 Jessica McKenna as Flairence Sparrow, an inter-dimensional lawyer. ("Ad Quod Danmum")
 Carl Tart as Tampa Bay the Buccaneer, a sailor in the expanse of nothingness. ("The Starshade Expanse")
 Tom Kenny as Legnahcra the angel from Virtuous Harmony. ("The Virtuous Harmony")

Episodes

Series overview

All ten episodes of the first season were released on July 14, 2016, on Seeso. On October 19, 2016, HarmonQuest was renewed for a second season, but due to uncertainty around Seeso's future, rights to HarmonQuest were sold to Otter Media's VRV streaming service in June 2017. The second season premiered on VRV Select on September 15 and concluded on November 17, 2017. In October 2018, it was announced that VRV has renewed the show for a third season, which debuted on August 18, 2019.

Season 1 (2016)

Season 2 (2017)

Season 3 (2019)

Production

Development

Prior to the creation of HarmonQuest, Harmon had included a Dungeons & Dragons-style segment, hosted by Crittenden, at the end of the weekly podcast Harmontown. When Harmon pitched the idea of HarmonQuest, which was originally conceived as a low-budget online show, NBC Universal executive vice-president of digital enterprises Evan Shapiro became interested in the idea. When Seeso was developed as an NBC-owned comedy channel, an order for ten episodes of HarmonQuest was confirmed. The show is produced by Universal Cable Productions and Starburns Industries.

Filming and animation

The show is recorded in front of a live audience at Victory Studios in Glendale, California, with parts of the stories being animated later. Filming typically takes place over an hour, which is then edited down to the 25-minute runtime. Harmon has cited The Ricky Gervais Show as an influence, as it also features a mix of live and animated footage.

Reception
The series has been likened to Critical Role, a web series streaming on Twitch and later uploaded to the Geek & Sundry YouTube channel since 2015. Unlike Critical Role episodes which are long-form, full-play D&D podcasts often exceeding 4hrs, HarmonQuest has been praised for its accessibility towards casual and beginner audiences. Javon Phillips of the LA Times said, "The show makes its ventures a lot less time-consuming and ups the watchability quotient by throwing in animated segments in digestible half-hour episodes. Gamemaster Spencer Crittenden approaches the show as just that — a show. It’s not just players playing the game and showing off their multi-sided dice-rolling skills."

See also
 Critical Role
 The Adventure Zone

Notes

References

External links
 

2016 web series debuts
2019 web series endings
2010s American adult animated television series
Actual play web series
American adult animated comedy television series
American adult animated web series
American comedy web series
American television series with live action and animation
English-language television shows
Seeso original programming
Television series by Universal Content Productions
Television series created by Dan Harmon